Thyasidae is a family of mites in the order Trombidiformes. There are about 7 genera and more than 30 described species in Thyasidae.

Genera
These nine genera belong to the family Thyasidae:
 Euthyas Piersig, 1898
 Thyas Dall, 1900
 Thyasides Lundblad, 1926
 Thyopsella Cook, 1955
 Thyopsis Piersig, 1899
 Trichothyas Viets, 1926
 Zschokkea Koenike, 1892

References

Further reading

 

Trombidiformes
Acari families